ID3 is a metadata format for MP3 audio files.

ID3 or ID-3 may also refer to:
 ID3 algorithm, an algorithm for constructing decision trees
 ID3 (gene), a human protein
 ID-3 format, a standard size for identification cards defined by ISO/IEC 7810
 ID3, a post-dubstep/glitch artist
 Volkswagen ID.3, a car model built by the German manufacturer Volkswagen